This article shows all participating team squads at the 2014 Men's European Water Polo Championship, held in Hungary from 14 to 27 July 2014.

























References

Men
Men's European Water Polo Championship
European Water Polo Championship squads